E24 Næringsliv, formerly N24, is a Norwegian, online business newspaper launched on 18 April 2006. 

During the first three years of operation, the newspaper was owned 60% by Aftenposten and 40% by Verdens Gang (VG), both fully owned by public media company Schibsted. Verdens Gang (VG) owns 100% of E24 Næringsliv. 

In the course of the first week of operations it became the largest business web site in Norway. In week 46, 2008, it had 575,000 unique users per week.

In 2013 E24 Næringsliv merged with monthly business magazine Dine Penger.

References

External links
 Official site

2006 establishments in Norway
2013 disestablishments in Norway
Business newspapers
Defunct newspapers published in Norway
European news websites
Norwegian-language newspapers
Publications established in 2006
Publications disestablished in 2013